Bleu Bénédictin is a Canadian blue cheese made by the monks at the Benedictine Abbey of Saint-Benoît-du-Lac, Quebec.

The cheese is a semi-soft, whole milk blue cheese deeply veined with the Roquefort penicillium mold.  A wheel of Bénédictin weighs  and has a whitish-grey coating.

The aroma of the cheese is reminiscent of mushrooms and has a creamy, delicately salted flavour.  The middle of the cheese wheel is especially creamy.

See also
 List of cheeses

References

External links
 Abbaye de Saint-Benoît-du-Lac 
 Bleu Bénédictin entry on the Canadian Cheese Encyclopedia.  

Canadian cheeses
Blue cheeses
Cow's-milk cheeses